Elk Island may refer to:

 Elk Island (electoral district), a federal electoral district in the province of Alberta, Canada
 Elk Island National Park, Alberta, Canada
 Elk Island Provincial Park, Saskatchewan, Canada
 Elk Island (Richland County, Montana), an island in the Yellowstone River
 Elk Island (Flathead County, Montana), an island in Hungry Horse Reservoir
 A fictional island used in cartoon television series Hey Arnold! and Arthur.